In expository writing, a topic sentence is a sentence that summarizes the main idea of a paragraph. It is usually the first sentence in a paragraph.

Also known as a focus sentence, it encapsulates or organizes an entire paragraph. Although topic sentences may appear anywhere in a paragraph, in academic essays they often appear at the beginning.
The topic sentence acts as a kind of summary, and offers the reader an insightful view of the writer’s main ideas for the following paragraph. More than just being a mere summary, however, a topic sentence often provides a claim or an insight directly or indirectly related to the thesis. It adds cohesion to a paper and helps organize ideas both within the paragraph and the whole body of work at large. As the topic sentence encapsulates the idea of the paragraph, serving as a sub-thesis, it remains general enough to cover the support given in the body paragraph while being more direct than the thesis of the paper.

Forms

Complex sentences 

A complex sentence is one that has a main clause which could stand alone and a dependent clause which cannot by itself be a sentence. Using a complex sentence is a way to refer to the content of the paragraph above (dependent clause) and then bring in the content of the new paragraph (the independent clause). Here is a typical example:  

The beginning, dependent, clause probably refers to the content of a preceding paragraph that presented the ant as a community-focused worker. As suggested by the main clause, which is the second within the sentence, the new paragraph will address how the ant works to benefit herself as well.

Questions 

Questions at the beginning of new paragraphs can make topic sentences which both remind the reader of what was in the previous paragraph and signal the introduction of something new. Consider this example of a question for a topic sentence:

This question refers to the content of the previous paragraph, but it introduces the content for the new one – how the budget cuts may not in fact be enough to balance the budget.

Bridge sentences 

A "bridge sentence" reminds the reader of what went before and does not signal what is to come. It merely hints that something new is about to be introduced.

Pivots 

Pivot topic sentences will come somewhere in the middle of a paragraph, and usually announce that the content will be changing in a different direction. These are often used when there are two differing opinions about something or when two "experts" are being quoted or referred to that may have a different opinion or approach to something. A paragraph may begin something like this:

The first part of this paragraph addresses Kubler and Kessler; the second part will obviously address another opinion. The topic sentence is underlined to show the pivot point in the paragraph. Pivot topic sentences will always have some clue word, such as "yet," "sometimes," or "however."

See also
Essay
Lead paragraph
Thesis statement

References

Syntactic entities